Department of Inspection for Factories and Establishments is an autonomous government agency responsible for health and safety inspection in factories and industries in Bangladesh and is located in Dhaka, Bangladesh. It also provides factories with information and training regarding workers safety and the enforcement of labour laws in Bangladesh.

History
Department of Inspection for Factories and Establishments was established on 1969 by the government of Pakistan on the recommendations of Air Vice Marshal Malik Nur Khan as the Directorate of Inspection for Factories and Establishments. After the Independence of Bangladesh in 1971 the Directorate was placed under the Ministry of Labour and Employment. On 15  January 2014 the Ministry of Labour and Employment upgraded the Directorate of Inspection for Factories and Establishments into the Department of Inspection for Factories and Establishments.

References

Government agencies of Bangladesh
1969 establishments in East Pakistan
Organisations based in Dhaka
Industry in Bangladesh
Occupational safety and health organizations
Ministry of Labour and Employment (Bangladesh)